Julian Bannerman is a British garden designer and architect known for his work in the UK.

Awards & Honors
Gold Medal at the RHS Chelsea Flower Show in 1994.

1997 Royal Warrant awarded by the Prince of Wales.

2007 Christie's Garden of the Year Award for Houghton Hall.

In 2010 the Bannermans along with public garden designer Lynden Miller completed the Queen Elizabeth II September 11th Garden, located in Hanover Square in the Financial District of New York City.  It commemorates the 67 British victims of the September 11, 2001 attack on the World Trade Center. Queen Elizabeth II attended the opening on July 6, 2010.

Personal Life
In the 1970s, Bannerman worked for Richard Demarco on Edinburgh Arts and in the Demarco Gallery.

Career
Bannerman sold the Ivy in 1993 and moved to Hanham Court near Bristol, where they restored the court and created a garden open to the public.

Refernces

Living people
British gardeners
Garden design
Landscape architects
Landscape garden designers